Bloomingdale Township is one of nine townships in DuPage County, Illinois, USA.  As of the 2010 census, its population was 111,899 and it contained 42,395 housing units.

Geography

Cities, towns, villages
 Addison (west quarter)
 Bloomingdale
 Carol Stream (partial)
 Glendale Heights (vast majority)
 Hanover Park (partial)
 Itasca (partial)
 Lombard (north edge)
 Roselle (partial)
 Schaumburg (partial)
 Winfield (north edge)

Unincorporated towns
 Cloverdale at 
 Glen Ellyn Countryside at 
 Keeneyville at 
 Medinah at 
 Swift at 
(This list is based on USGS data and may include former settlements.)

Cemeteries
The township contains these seven cemeteries: Bloomingdale, Cloverdale, Freinenigreit, Old Ontarioville, St. Andrew Ukrainian Orthodox, St. Isidore's and St. Luke's Lutheran.

Major highways
  Interstate 355
  U.S. Route 20
  Illinois Route 19
  Illinois Route 53
  Illinois Route 64
  Illinois Route 390

Airports and landing strips
 Clarke Heliport
 Mitchell Field (historical)
 Schaumburg Regional Airport (partial)

Lakes
 Kadijah Lake
 Mallard Lake

Landmarks
 Du Page County Forest Preserve
 Mallard Lake County Forest Preserve

Demographics

Political districts
 Illinois's 6th congressional district
 State House District 45
 State House District 55
 State House District 56
 State Senate District 23
 State Senate District 28

Notes

References
 
 United States Census Bureau 2008 TIGER/Line Shapefiles
 United States National Atlas

External links
 
 City-Data.com
 Illinois State Archives
 Township Officials of Illinois

1849 establishments in Illinois
Populated places established in 1849
Townships in DuPage County, Illinois
Townships in Illinois